British Forces Cyprus (BFC) is the name given to the British Armed Forces stationed in the UK Sovereign Base Areas of Akrotiri and Dhekelia on the island of Cyprus and at a number of related 'retained sites' in the Republic of Cyprus. The United Kingdom retains a military presence on the island in order to keep a strategic location at the eastern end of the Mediterranean, for use as a staging point for forces sent to locations in the Middle East and Asia. BFC is a tri-service command, with all three services based on the island reporting to it.

History

Following the establishment of the Republic of Cyprus in 1960, the UK retained two Sovereign Base Areas in Akrotiri and Dhekelia and an RAF air marshal was appointed as the Administrator of the Sovereign Base Areas. The Treaty of Establishment also provided British access to 40 'retained sites' in the republic of Cyprus; these included numerous radar stations, several ports, a range of accommodation and support facilities and a firing range. In March of the following year British Forces Near East was created, the command of which was then held concurrently with that of the post of Administrator.

On 1 March 1961, the Southern Group of Middle East Air Force became Near East Air Force and was based in Cyprus. By 1962, the title British Forces in Cyprus was in official use. In 1976, as part of a Foreign and Commonwealth Office brief in preparation for the visit of the CENTO Secretary-General to the UK, it was recorded that: 
..two Vulcan medium bomber squadrons, one Lightning all-weather fighter squadron, one Hercules transport squadron and one Whirlwind helicopter squadron were stationed on the island. It would be very difficult to relocate these forces and their training facilities to a base in a CENTO member state since an agreement would have to be negotiated. Besides, the United Kingdom would also have to pay the host nation for facilities granted. The sites in Cyprus were guarded by one infantry battalion, defended by a Bloodhound anti-aircraft missile squadron and one armoured car squadron. In fact, the Vulcans based at Akrotiri were ‘the only declared nuclear force in CENTO’ and the island played a unique part in the capacity of the air route of CENTO for the transfer of forces east of Suez in times of war. The radar sites and the fighter squadron were considered an extension of the NATO air defence system." 

British Forces Cyprus retains the right to use 13 retained sites with the remaining 27 having been returned to Cyprus after the Ministry of Defence no longer required them. The most recent sites to be returned were the Berengaria Married Quarters in 2011, because they had become obsolete and the firing range on the Akamas peninsula in 1999-2001. Its training value was deemed less important than the environmental damage inflicted on an ecologically important area and the consequent political liability to British Forces Cyprus.

Force structure 

Episkopi is the current location of Headquarters British Forces Cyprus. Commander British Forces Cyprus (CBF) and Administrator of the Sovereign Base Areas is a two-star appointment, alternating every three years between a British Army major-general and a Royal Air Force air vice-marshal. Consequently, the Chief of Staff British Forces Cyprus (COS) is a one-star appointment from the opposite service of the commander.

Episkopi Cantonment is home to the Sovereign Base Areas Administration, the civilian authority in the territory.

Within British Forces Cyprus are a number of permanently based units; however, the large proportion of British forces in Cyprus are rotated between Cyprus and the UK:

Permanent Units
HQ, British Forces Cyprus
Joint Service Signal Unit (Cyprus) (Ayios Nikolaos Station)
Regimental Headquarters
234 Signal Squadron
 840 Signal Squadron RAF
 Engineering Squadron
 Support Squadron
Cyprus Communications Unit (an amalgamation of 12 Signals Unit RAF at Episkopi (1 June 1969 - 1 Sept 2002) & 259 Signal Squadron, Royal Signals)
Cyprus Operations Support Unit
 Military Transport Squadron 
 Joint Movement Squadron 
 Joint Engineer Squadron 
 Air Operations Squadron  
No. 84 Squadron RAF
No. 15 Squadron RAF Regiment (Resident Force Protection Squadron, August–December 2022)
Resident infantry battalions — two light role infantry battalions, one at Dhekelia and one at Episkopi, are permanently based on the island; the battalions are usually rotated every two years. 
1st Battalion The Princess of Wales's Royal Regiment (Queen's and Royal Hampshires)
2nd Battalion The Mercian Regiment (Cheshire, Worcesters & Foresters, and Staffords)
Cyprus Military Working Dog Troop, Episkopi
Cyprus Joint Police Unit (CJPU), HQ Episkopi, a Tri-Service Military Police Unit consisting of Royal Navy Police, Royal Military Police and RAF Police.
 1 Platoon CJPU — Dhekelia
 2 Platoon CJPU — Episkopi
 3 Platoon CJPU — Akrotiri (closed 2003)
 Special Investigation Branch (SIB) Cyprus
 ESBA Section SIB
Civilian Components
 Sovereign Base Areas Customs
 Sovereign Base Areas Police
 Security Force Police
Public Health and Environmental Health Services
Joint Services Health Unit (Formed in 1958) 
HQ Akrotiri 
No. 1 detachment RAF Akrotiri 
No. 2 detachment Episkopi
No. 4 detachment Dhekelia

The Queen's and King's Divisions continue to rotate battalions through Cyprus every three years.

Commanders

The following officers have been in command of British Forces Cyprus:

General Officer Commanding Cyprus District
18 March 1955 — Major-General Abdy Ricketts
19 October 1956 — Major-General Douglas Kendrew
11 October 1958 — Major-General Kenneth Darling

Commander, British Forces in Cyprus
16 August 1960 — Air Marshal Sir William MacDonald (Administrator of the SBAs from 1960)
16 July 1962 — Air Chief Marshal Sir Denis Barnett, Air Officer Commanding-in-Chief Near East and Commander British Forces in Cyprus.
25 September 1964 — Air Marshal T O Prickett; Air Vice-Marshal T O Prickett CB, DSO, DFC, was "appointed Air Officer Commanding-in-Chief Near East Air Force and Commander, British Forces in Cyprus, with the acting rank of Air Marshal in succession to" Air Chief Marshal Barnett, 25 Sept 1964.
21 November 1966 — Air Marshal E G Jones "appointed Air Officer Commanding-in-Chief Near East Air Force and Commander, British Forces in Cyprus, with the acting rank of Air Marshal in succession to Air Marshal Sir Thomas Prickett"
6 May 1969 — Air Marshal D G Smallwood
2 July 1970 — Air Marshal W D Hodgkinson, Commander, British Forces Near East; AOC in C, Near East Air Force; Administrator, Sovereign Base Areas of Akrotiri and Dhekelia
25 June 1973 — Air Marshal Sir John Aiken as Commander, British Forces Near East and Air Officer Commanding-in-Chief Near East Air Force Still Commander British Forces Near East in 1974.

Commander, British Forces Cyprus
1 April 1976 — Air Vice-Marshal R D Austen-Smith as Commander, British Forces Cyprus/Air Commander, Cyprus and, Administrator, British Sovereign Base Areas - Cyprus on 1 April 1976;
28 April 1978 — Major-General W R Taylor
3 October 1980 — Air Vice-Marshal R L Davis
31 March 1983 — Major-General Sir Desmond Langley
29 October 1985 — Air Vice-Marshal K W Hayr
21 April 1988 — Major-General J P W Friedberger
1990 — Air Vice-Marshal A F C Hunter
25 March 1993 — Major-General A G H Harley
17 February 1995 — Air Vice-Marshal P Millar
16 January 1998 — Major-General A I Ramsay
5 September 2000 — Air Vice-Marshal T W Rimmer
5 September 2003 — Major-General P T C Pearson
26 April 2006 — Air Vice-Marshal R H Lacey
16 October 2008 — Major-General J H Gordon
4 November 2010 — Air Vice-Marshal G E Stacey
3 January 2012 — Major-General R Cripwell
20 January 2015 — Air Vice-Marshal M Wigston
February 2017 — Major-General J T E Illingworth
25 September 2019 – Major-General R J Thomson
August 2022 – Air Vice-Marshal P J M Squires

Operation TOSCA

Operation TOSCA is the name given to the British contribution to the United Nations Peacekeeping Force in Cyprus (UNFICYP). The British Contingent (BRITCON) numbers between 200 and 300, and consists of three distinct parts:
HQ BRITCON — responsible for the administration and support of the British Contingent.
Force Military Police Unit — the FMPU is commanded by a major of the Royal Military Police, with seven other members of the RMP as part of the multi-national unit.
UN Roulement Regiment — the URR has responsibility for patrolling Sector 2 of the Green Line in Nicosia.

The URR is drawn from across the Field Army, and will not necessarily be a specialist combat unit (infantry or cavalry), or even part of the Regular Army, as, since 2008, units of the Territorial Army / Army Reserve have undertaken deployments to the Green Line.

One of the roles of the support units of BFC is to assist as needed the British units deployed with UNFICYP, which are not part of BFC, but are instead under the direct command of the United Nations.

Units
Listed is the unit that provided the Regimental Headquarters and the bulk of the troops. Often soldiers from a number of Territorial Army units would also deploy as part of the force.

April 1973 – October 1973: 1st Battalion, Parachute Regiment

October 1973 – April 1974:

April 1974 – October 1974: 2nd Battalion, Coldstream Guards
October 1974 – April 1975: Queen's Royal Irish Hussars
April 1975 – October 1975: 1st Royal Tank Regiment

October 1975 – April 1976:
April 1976 – October 1976:

October 1976 – April 1977: 1st Battalion, Parachute Regiment
April 1977 – October 1977: 1st Battalion, Royal Irish Rangers

October 1977 – April 1978:

April 1978 – October 1978: 1st Battalion, Royal Regiment of Fusiliers
October 1978 – April 1979: 3rd Battalion, The Light Infantry

April 1979 – October 1979: 

October 1979 – April 1980: 1st Battalion, The Light Infantry
April 1980 – October 1980: 3rd Battalion, Royal Green Jackets
October 1980 – April 1981: 3rd Battalion, Royal Anglian Regiment
April 1981 – October 1981: 1st Battalion, Green Howards
October 1981 – April 1982: 2nd Battalion, Queen's Regiment
April 1982 – October 1982: 1st Battalion, Gloucestershire Regiment
October 1982 – April 1983: 2nd Battalion, Grenadier Guards
April 1983 – October 1983: 1st Battalion, Queen's Lancashire Regiment
October 1983 – June 1984: 2nd Battalion, Royal Anglian Regiment

June 1984 – December 1984: 

December 1984 – June 1985: 1st Battalion, Duke of Edinburgh's Royal Regiment (Berkshire and Wiltshire)
June 1985 – December 1985: 2nd Battalion, Royal Irish Rangers
December 1985 – June 1986: 2nd Battalion, Royal Regiment of Fusiliers
June 1986 – December 1986: 3rd Battalion, Parachute Regiment
December 1986 – June 1987: 3rd Battalion, Royal Regiment of Fusiliers
June 1987 – December 1987: 1st Battalion, Worcestershire and Sherwood Foresters Regiment
December 1987 – June 1988: 1st Battalion, King's Own Royal Border Regiment
June 1988 – December 1988: 4th/7th Royal Dragoon Guards
December 1988 – June 1989: 12 Air Defence Regiment, Royal Artillery

June 1989 – December 1989:

December 1989 – June 1990: 2 Field Regiment, Royal Artillery
June 1990 – December 1990: 22 Regiment, Royal Artillery
December 1990 – June 1991: Queen's Own Hussars?

June 1991 – December 1991:

December 1991 – June 1992: 15th/19th The King's Royal Hussars
June 1992 – December 1992: 5 Regiment, Royal Artillery
December 1992 – June 1993: Queen's Royal Irish Hussars
June 1993 – December 1993: 39 Regiment, Royal Artillery
December 1993 – June 1994: 2nd Royal Tank Regiment
June 1994 – December 1994: 7th Field Regiment, Royal Horse Artillery
December 1994 – June 1995: 29 Commando Regiment, Royal Artillery and Queen's Royal Lancers

June 1995 – December 1995:

December 1995 – June 1996: 12 Regiment, Royal Artillery
June 1996 – December 1996: 39 Regiment, Royal Artillery
December 1996 – June 1997: 32 Regiment, Royal Artillery
June 1997 – December 1997: 5 Regiment, Royal Artillery
December 1997 – June 1998: 1st Royal Tank Regiment
June 1998 – December 1998: 19 Regiment, Royal Artillery
December 1998 – June 1999: 47 Regiment, Royal Artillery
June 1999 – December 1999: 22 Regiment, Royal Artillery
December 1999 – June 2000: 1st Battalion, Staffordshire Regiment
June 2000 – December 2000: 16 Regiment, Royal Artillery
December 2000 – June 2001: Queen's Royal Lancers
June 2001 – December 2001: 12 Regiment, Royal Artillery
December 2001 – June 2002: 32 Regiment, Royal Artillery

June 2002 – December 2002:
December 2002 – June 2003:

June 2003 – December 2003:  22 Regiment, Royal Artillery
December 2003 – June 2003: 3rd Regiment, Royal Horse Artillery

June 2003 – December 2003:
December 2003 – June 2004:

June 2004 – December 2004: 40 Regiment, Royal Artillery
December 2004 – ? 2005: 26 Regiment, Royal Artillery
2005: 1st Regiment, Royal Horse Artillery

October 2007 – April 2008: 10 Queen's Own Gurkha Logistic Regiment, Royal Logistic Corps

April 2008 – October 2008: 

October 2008 – April 2009: 32 Signal Regiment, Royal Corps of Signals (first deployment of a Territorial Army unit for the Operation)
April 2009 – October 2009: 23 Pioneer Regiment, Royal Logistic Corps
October 2009 – April 2010: 27 Regiment, Royal Logistic Corps
April 2010 – October 2010: 40 Signal Regiment, Royal Corps of Signals

October 2010 – April 2011:

April 2011 – October 2011: 3rd Battalion, Royal Anglian Regiment
October 2011 – April 2012: 23 Pioneer Regiment, Royal Logistic Corps
April 2012 – October 2012: 29 Regiment, Royal Logistic Corps
October 2012 – April 2013: 101 Force Support Battalion, Royal Electrical and Mechanical Engineers
April 2013 – October 2013: 17 Port and Maritime Regiment, Royal Logistic Corps
October 2013 – April 2014: 28 Engineer Regiment, Royal Engineers
April 2014 – October 2014: 1st Battalion, Irish Guards
October 2014 – April 2015: 2nd Battalion, Mercian Regiment
April 2015 – October 2015: Black Watch, 3rd Battalion, Royal Regiment of Scotland
October 2015 – April 2016: Royal Scots Borderers, 1st Battalion, Royal Regiment of Scotland
April 2016 – October 2016: 36 Engineer Regiment, Royal Engineers
October 2016 – April 2017: 4th Battalion, Duke of Lancaster's Regiment
April 2017 – October 2017: 7 Regiment, Royal Logistic Corps
October 2017 – April 2018: Royal Scots Dragoon Guards
April 2018 – October 2018: Royal Lancers (Queen Elizabeths' Own)
October 2018 – April 2019: 1st Battalion, Scots Guards
April 2019 – October 2019: 4 Regiment, Royal Artillery
October 2019 – April 2020: 27 Regiment, Royal Logistic Corps
April 2020 – October 2020: 7th Battalion, The Rifles and 5th Battalion, Royal Regiment of Fusiliers
October 2020 – April 2021: 6th Battalion, The Rifles
April 2021 – October 2021: 6 Regiment, Royal Logistic Corps
October 2021 – April 2022: 1st Battalion, The Rifles
April 2022 – present: 21 Engineer Regiment, Royal Engineers

British Forces Cyprus Installations

The Republic of Cyprus

In addition to the Sovereign Base Areas of Akrotiri and Dhekelia, 1960 Treaty of Establishment between the United Kingdom and the Republic of Cyprus granted the UK the right to permanently make use of 40 further sites on the island for military purposes.

Occupied Northern Cyprus

Three retained Military facilities are located within the territory of Northern Cyprus. They are not currently in use by British Forces Cyprus because the UK does not acknowledge the Government of Northern Cyprus.

Sovereign Base Areas of Akrotiri and Dhekelia

The two British enclaves in the Republic of Cyprus, act as platforms for the projection of British military assets in the Eastern Mediterranean and the Middle East. The enclaves serve as centres for regional communications monitoring from the eastern Mediterranean through the Middle East to Iran. Facilities within the retained areas also support British military activities on retained sites in the Republic of Cyprus and provide unique training opportunities.

Western Sovereign Base Area

Eastern Sovereign Base Area

See also

Cyprus Seven Trial
Episkopi Cantonment
Sovereign Base Areas

References

External links
British Army deployment Cyprus
Permanent Joint HQ Overseas Bases Cyprus

Cyprus
 
Joint commands of the United Kingdom
Cyprus and the Commonwealth of Nations
United Kingdom and the Commonwealth of Nations
Military of Sovereign Base Areas of Akrotiri and Dhekelia